Parliamentary elections were held in Portugal on 3 and 17 August 1845.

Electoral system
The elections were held under the Constitutional Charter of 1826, and in accordance with a decree issued on 28 April 1845. Members of the Chamber of Deputies were elected in an indirect system in which voters elected provincial assemblies, who in turn elected members of the Chamber.

The 142 members of the Chamber of Deputies included 119 representing the mainland and 10 representing islands (all elected in multi-member constituencies), with another 13 representing overseas colonies (three elected in single-member constituencies and ten in multi-member constituencies).

Results
The result was a victory for the Cabralistas, with Miguelistas advising voters to boycott the elections. The opposition won only six seats in Alentejo.

References

1845
1845 in Portugal
1845 elections in Europe
August 1845 events